Kairali School was established in 1978. The school is located in the heart of HEC (Heavy Engineering Corporation) Sector-2, Ranchi, India owned and managed by the Malayalee association, Ranchi.The school is English medium and maintains education levels as prescribed by Central Board of Secondary Education (CBSE), Delhi. It started the course of AISSCE (11th and 12th standard)  in the year 2004. As of 2021, the principal of Kairali School is Jacob C J and the vice-principals are Suja Pillai and K.R. Smriti.

See also
Education in India

CBSE Delhi
Schools in Ranchi